Candela is a dansband from Vejbystrand in Sweden, established in 1984

Members
Vocals
1984–1985 — Charlene Sheppard
1985–1986 — Marie Hansen
1986–1991 — Maivor Ohlsson
1991–1996 — Jenny Öhlund
1997 — Helena Eriksson
1996–2000 — Lena Göransson
2000–2004 — Lotta Nilsson
2005– Maria Knutsson

Guitar
1990–1995 — Antti Johansson
1995–1996 — Per-Ola Lindholm
1995–2000 — Jonas Sandquist
1996–2000 — Lena Göransson
2000–2005 — Mikael Dahlkvist
2005– — Martin Blad
2009– — Magnus Karlsson

Bass
1984–1985 — Billy Heil
1986–1988 — Jonas Sandquist
1989–1996, 2005 — Billy Heil
1997–1999 — Pelle Eldonson
1999–2003 — Jerker Brosson
2003–2005 — Göran Forsén
2005–2006 — Ola Strömberg

Keyboards
1989–2003 — John Ebbesson
2003–2004 Stamatios Karavas
2005–2006 — Tommy Jonsson
2006 — Lars Johansson

Saxophone
1990–1995 — Antti Johansson
1995–1996 — Per-Ola Lindholm
1996–2000 — Lena Göransson

Drums
1987–1988 — Martin Sandberg
1989–1991 — Frans Ebbesson
1992–1998 — Andy Johansson
1999–2005 — Martin Sandberg
2005 — Mats Bengtsson
2006–2009 — Jan-Erik Johansson
2009– — Magnus Fransson

Discography

Albums
1994: Candelas blå
1995: Candelas vita
1996: Candela Collection
2002: Blå vind

Svensktoppen songs
1994: "När du ser på mig"
1994: "Du finns i mina tankar"
1995: "Nätterna med dig"
1995: "Jag önskar mig"
1996: "Malmö-Köpenhamn"
2002: "Minnet av dig"

References

External links
Official website

1984 establishments in Sweden
Dansbands
Musical groups established in 1984
Scania